Blanca Wiethüchter López (La Paz, August 17, 1947 – Cochabamba, October 16, 2004) was a Bolivian writer, historian, and publisher. Her parents were German immigrants. She became one of the most enigmatic and recognized authors of Bolivian literature in the 20th and 21st centuries. She published essays, short stories, and poems. Hers was one of the iconic female voices of Bolivian poetry of the late 20th century. Her writing spanned three decades, from the mid-1970s until her death in 2004. She graduated in Letters from the Higher University of San Andrés and in Learning sciences from the Sorbonne; she earned a Master's degree in Latin American Literature at the University of Paris. Wiethüchter was editor of the cultural supplement in "La Hormiga Eléctrica" in of the literary magazines Hipótesis and Piedra Imán. She served as editorial director of "Hombrecito sentado" and "Mujercita Sentada"; and was the co-founder of the cultural space Puraduralubia (1993). She taught at the Catholic University of Bolivia and the Higher University of San Andrés.

Wiethüchter was married to the composer Alberto Villalpando, and they had three daughters. She died in Cochabamba in 2004, and her ashes were strewn on Lake Titicaca.

Selected works

Poetry 
 Asistir al tiempo, 1975
 Travesía, 1978
 Noviembre 79, 1979
 Madera viva y árbol difunto, 1982
 Territorial, 1983
 El verde no es un color: A la luz de una provincia tropical, 1992
 Los negros labios encantados, 1992
 El rigor de la llama, 1994
 La Lagarta, 1995
 'Sayariy', 1995
 Qantatai (o Iluminado), 1996
 Antología La Piedra que labra otra piedra, 1999
 Ítaca, 2000
 Luminar, 2005
 Ángeles del miedo, 2005

Short stories 
 Memoria Solicitada, 1989
 En el aire de navegación de las montañas, 1992
 A manera de Prólogo, 1993

Novel 
 El jardín de Nora 1998

Essays 
 La Estructura de lo Imaginario en la Obra Poética de Jaime Saenz, 1976
 Hacia una historia crítica de la literatura en Bolivia I y II, 2002
 Pérez Alcalá, o los melancólicos senderos del tiempo, 1997

References

1947 births
2004 deaths
Bolivian essayists
21st-century Bolivian poets
Bolivian women essayists
Bolivian women short story writers
Bolivian women poets
20th-century Bolivian women writers
21st-century Bolivian women writers
20th-century Bolivian poets
Bolivian people of German descent
Writers from La Paz
20th-century short story writers
21st-century short story writers
20th-century essayists
21st-century essayists